Nogalus Prairie is an unincorporated community and farming community in Trinity County, Texas, United States.  It is located on Farm Road 357, just west of Centralia, and 13 miles northeast of Groveton. In 2000, the estimated population was 41 residents.

Historical development
The area was first settled by farmers migrating from Alabama and Georgia, under which the area was called Prairie View. A post office opened there under the name Nogallis Prairie in 1858. From local tradition stories, it is believed that two horse thieves were hanged there under a large tree, and that the community was then called "Nogallows" by some. In the early 1860s, the spelling of the post office was changed eventually to its present form. The post office closed in 1868, but would re-open again in the 1890s under the name Nogalus. John Wesley Hardin committed murders in this county. Population wise, the town would suffer the same fate as Centralia, Texas did after World War I. From the mid-1930s, only a few families would remain there. The remaining residents as of the 1960s were farmers and ranchers, with some involved in the timber industry.

References

Unincorporated communities in Trinity County, Texas
Unincorporated communities in Texas